Chandranath Chatterjee (1 February 1954 – 5 March 1994) was an Indian cricketer. He played one first-class match for Bengal in 1986/87.

See also
 List of Bengal cricketers

References

External links
 

1954 births
1994 deaths
Indian cricketers
Bengal cricketers
Cricketers from Kolkata